Suga'erbu (born June 1964) is a Chinese politician of Yi ethnicity currently serving as director of Sichuan Provincial Commission of Ethnic and Religious. Previously he served as governor of Liangshan Yi Autonomous Prefecture. He was a delegate to the 13th National People's Congress.

Biography
Suga'erbu was born in Yuexi County, Sichuan, in June 1964. He graduated from Xichang University and the Central Party School of the Chinese Communist Party.

Suga'erbu joined the Chinese Communist Party (CCP) in June 1985. He began his political career in July 1985 from Butuo County, and eventually becoming magistrate in December 1997 and party secretary in March 2001. In November 2006, he was admitted to member of the Standing Committee of the CCP Liangshan Yi Autonomous Prefectural Committee, the prefecture's top authority. He was head of the United Front Work Department in December 2006 and deputy party secretary in November 2011. In November 2016, he was named acting governor of the prefecture, confirmed in February 2017. In September 2021, he was chosen as director of Sichuan Provincial Commission of Ethnic and Religious.

References

1964 births
Living people
Yi people
People from Yuexi County, Sichuan
Central Party School of the Chinese Communist Party alumni
People's Republic of China politicians from Sichuan
Chinese Communist Party politicians from Sichuan
Governors of Liangshan Yi Autonomous Prefecture
Delegates to the 13th National People's Congress